Pargny-sous-Mureau is a commune in the Vosges department in Grand Est in northeastern France.

Geography
The commune occupies the valley of the little River Saônelle, being positioned between Liffol-le-Grand et Coussey, near the western edge of the département.

The abbey
The Premonstratensian Abbey was demolished in 1790, though a few pieces of walls and a porch survive, albeit in an increasingly bad condition.

A stream crosses the grounds of the former abbey, its water still channeled for a section, within a man-made tunnel.

See also
Communes of the Vosges department

References

Communes of Vosges (department)